The Mysterious Ailment of Rupi Baskey is a novel by Indian author Hansda Sowvendra Shekhar. Published in the year 2014, this was his first book. For this novel, Shekhar won the 2015  Yuva Puraskar, was shortlisted for the 2014 Crossword Book Award and the 2014 Hindu Literary Prize, longlisted for the 2016 International Dublin Literary Award, and jointly won the 2015 Muse India Young Writer Award. As of December 2019, this book has been translated into Tamil and Bengali. The Mysterious Ailment of Rupi Baskey was named by The Hindu in December 2019 as one of the ten best fiction books of the decade.

References

External links
 

2014 Indian novels
Indian English-language novels
Aleph Book Company books